

Baroness and Countess of Taxis

Princess of Thurn and Taxis

Notes

Sources

 
Thurn and Taxis, consorts
Thurn and Taxis, consorts